Egg drop soup is a Chinese soup of wispy beaten eggs in chicken broth. Condiments such as black or white pepper, and finely chopped scallions and tofu are commonly added to the soup. The soup is made by adding a thin stream of beaten eggs to the boiling broth in the final moments of cooking, creating thin, silken strands or flakes of cooked egg that float in the soup.

American Chinese cuisine 

In the United States egg drop soup is often one of the main soups offered in American Chinese cuisine, and is also called egg flower soup, a literal translation of its Chinese name, on the menus of some restaurants. Cornstarch may be used to thicken it.

Chinese cuisine 
In Chinese cuisine, egg drop soups have a thinner consistency than most common Western variants. Depending on the region, they may be garnished with ingredients such as tofu, scallion, bean sprouts and corn.

Laotian cuisine

Mee ka tee is a Laotian red curry and coconut milk egg drop noodle soup.

European cuisine 
In Italy, a version made with egg and parmesan cheese, is popular, as is zuppa pavese, consisting of broth into which slices of stale bread and poached eggs are placed.

In France, a garlic soup, is made with egg whites which are drizzled into the soup in a similar way to how traditional egg drop soup is made.

In Spain, the similar and traditional  ("garlic soup") uses egg whites to thicken the broth in a similar way.

In Austria, egg drop soup ( or ) is a simple, traditional recipe generally made for very young children or sick people. Scrambled eggs are mixed with flour and then poured into boiling soup in order to make small egg dumplings. Spices can be added to the egg-flour mixture according to taste. yo mama 

There is a similar recipe in Polish cuisine (lit. 'poured noodles'), with the egg-flour mixture either poured directly into soup, or into boiling water, then strained and added to a soup or sauce.  For children, often simmering milk (optionally with sugar) is used in place of soup.

In Russia, semolina is usually boiled in the chicken stock before the eggs are whisked in for a more substantial result, and flavored with chopped scallion and black pepper. Simple egg dough dumplings similar to lazy  or the Ukrainian  are a frequent addition in the southern regions.

In Cyprus and Greece the egg is beaten and then slowly stirred in the soup so it does not curdle. Lemon and rice are the additional ingredients besides the chicken stock to make , originally a dish from Jewish cuisine.

See also 

 Egg tong sui
 List of Chinese soups

References 

Chinese soups
American Chinese cuisine
Appetizers
Austrian cuisine
Egg dishes
Japanese cuisine
Russian cuisine